Bell's sparrow (Artemisiospiza belli) is a medium-sized sparrow of the western United States and northwestern Mexico. It used to be placed in the genus Amphispiza, but recent evidence suggested it be placed in its own genus.

Four populations are resident to the west: subspecies canescens breeds in south-central California, the dark nominate subspecies belli in the California Coast Ranges and part of the western slope of the Sierra Nevada south to about 29°N in Baja California, the equally dark subspecies clementeae limited to San Clemente Island, and subspecies cinerea in western Baja California from 29°N to 26°45′N. The AOU now considers Bell's sparrow a separate species, formerly grouped with the sagebrush sparrow, and together previously known as the sage sparrow.

Characteristics

Bell's sparrow is difficult to separate in the field from the sagebrush sparrow. In general, with Bell's Sparrow the malar is darker than the head while on the sagebrush it is about the same shade of darkish gray. Bell's Sparrow also has a thicker malar strip than sagebrush. The amount a streaking on the back as well as the shade of the mantle may also be used to separate the two, but this is affected by wear on the feathers. Bell's also has little or no white in the tail, but this field mark alone may not be diagnostic.

Bell's sparrows are indeed often tied to sagebrush habitats, although they can also be found in brushy stands of saltbush, chamise, and other low shrubs of the arid west.

The subspecies A. b. clementeae has been listed as threatened since 1977. This subspecies has grown in numbers since then as a result of conservation efforts conducted by the US Navy, resulting in the regrowth of native vegetation.  and has been proposed for removal from the Endangered Species Act by the US Fish & Wildlife Service. 

The species' common name and binomial (belli) refer to John Graham Bell.

References

External links

 
 
 

Bell's sparrow
Native birds of the Western United States
Birds of Mexico
Fauna of the Sonoran Desert
Bell's sparrow
Bell's sparrow